Qualification for the women's tournament at the 2022 Winter Olympics was determined by the IIHF World Ranking following the 2020 Women's Ice Hockey World Championships. The host along with the top six teams in the world ranking received automatic berths into the Olympics, while all other teams had an opportunity to qualify for the remaining three spots in the Olympics.

Qualified teams
{| class="wikitable"
!Event
!Date
!Location
!Vacancies
!Qualified
|-
|Hosts
|17 May 2018
| Copenhagen
|align=center|1
|
|-
|2020 IIHF World Ranking
|12 December 2016 – 10 April 2020
|
|align=center|6
| ROC
|-
|rowspan=3|Final qualification tournament
|rowspan=3|11–14 November 2021
| Chomutov
|align=center|1
|
|-
| Füssen
|align=center|1
|
|-
| Luleå
|align=center|1
|
|-
! Total !! colspan=2| !! 10 !!
|}

Notes

Qualification seeding
To qualify directly, a nation had to be ranked in the top six following the 2020 Women's Ice Hockey World Championships. Using the IIHF World Ranking points system, the current year received full value, and each preceding year was worth 25% less. The following is a ranking based on points that were accumulated toward Olympic qualification.

Note: Several WC 2020 tournaments were cancelled due to the COVID-19 pandemic so points for that year were earned based on overall finish in 2019.

Solid shading indicate the nation is assured of being in that round.
If a nation does not register for olympic qualification those ranked lower move up.

Pre-qualification Round 1
Teams ranked 27th and lower would have played off to advance to the next round. The tournament was scheduled to take place from 17 to 19 December 2020, but was postponed due to the COVID-19 pandemic until 26 to 29 August 2021.

The tournament was supposed to be held in Reykjavík, Iceland and feature Iceland, Hong Kong, Bulgaria and Lithuania. However, it was cancelled on 9 August 2021 after Bulgaria withdrew and the other teams raised concerns because of the pandemic. As a result Iceland, the highest seeded team, automatically advanced to the next round.

Pre-qualification Round 2
Teams ranked 16th to 26th, plus one qualifier from Round 1 played in three tournaments to determine qualifiers for the next round. Each tournament winner was ranked by their qualification seeding and entered the next round as qualifier four, five or six. These tournaments were scheduled to take place from 11 to 14 February 2021, but were postponed to 7 to 10 October 2021.

Group F
The tournament was scheduled to be held in Gangneung, South Korea. On 3 September 2021, the IIHF announced that it had moved the tournament to Nottingham, Great Britain due to COVID-19 restrictions in South Korea.

All times are local (UTC+1).

Group G
The tournament was held in Torre Pellice, Italy.

All times are local (UTC+2).

Group H
The tournament was held in Bytom, Poland.

All times are local (UTC+2).

Final qualification
Teams ranked 7th to 15th, plus three qualifiers played in three tournaments to determine qualifiers for the Olympic tournament. Each tournament winner was ranked by their qualification seeding and played in Group B as qualifier one, two, or three. These tournaments were scheduled to take place from 26 to 29 August 2021, but were postponed until 11 to 14 November 2021.

Group C
The tournament was held in Chomutov, Czech Republic.

All times are local (UTC+1).

Group D
The tournament was held in Füssen, Germany.

All times are local (UTC+1).

Group E
The tournament was held at the Coop Norrbotten Arena in Luleå, Sweden.

All times are local (UTC+1).

References

External links
Official IOC/IIHF 2022 qualification document 

qualification
Qualification for the 2022 Winter Olympics
2020 in ice hockey
2021 in ice hockey
Ice hockey